Mohamed Abu Hamed Shaheen (born March 14, 1973) is an Egyptian politician. He is the former vice chairman of the Free Egyptians Party, and was an elected member of the post-revolutionary People's Assembly of Egypt, representing Kasr El Nil district in Cairo. He is the former head of the Free Egyptians Party's parliamentary bloc. He resigned from the party in early March 2012, though he rejoined the party in February 2015.

Early life and Career 
Mohamed Abu Hamed Shaheen graduated from the Accounting Department, Faculty of Commerce, Cairo University in 1995. Following 11 September events in the US, Abu Hamed registered a Ph.D. thesis in "Philosophy of Political Sciences and the Relation between Religion and Politics". The aim was to monitor the history of how these religions affected the politics, whether this impact is negative or positive and how to prevent the overlapping of religion and politics. Shaheen works in designing and evaluating financial information and international control systems and auditing. He is registered with the Ministry of Finance as a Chartered Accountant. Abu Hamed owns an Egyptian joint-stock company named 'Life Concept' this is specialized in financial consultancies, strategic planning and financial crisis management.

Political action 
Abu Hamed has participated in 25 January Revolution since the first day until the former President stepped down. He was a member of the Committee of 'Wise Men' and one of 22 persons who called for forming the Free Egyptians Party.
Abu Hamed is a member of the High Commission of El-Masryeen El-Ahrrar Party. He participated in setting forth the party's program relating to the political structure and different freedoms and human rights. He is the coordinator of eight Human Rights and Freedoms committees. He is the spokesperson for the Sisi Supporters Front, a merger of 28 groups that have called on Egyptian defense minister Abdel Fattah el-Sisi to run for president in the 2014 Egyptian presidential election.

References

Members of the House of Representatives (Egypt)
Free Egyptians Party politicians
Politicians from Cairo
Cairo University alumni
1973 births
Living people
Egyptian Patriotic Movement politicians